"Graveyard" is a song by American singer Halsey. It was released on September 13, 2019 through Capitol Records as the second single from her third studio album, Manic (2020). It reached the Top 40 in fifteen countries worldwide and is certified platinum in the United States, Canada, and Australia.

Background and promotion
In March 2019, Halsey announced that her upcoming third studio album would be released in 2019 and that she wants it to be "perfect". On September 3, 2019, Halsey revealed the cover art and release date of "Graveyard" on her social media. The announcement was made a day after fans questioned the singer about upcoming news. The song was made available for pre-save upon announcement. Halsey performed the song for the first time on September 11, 2019, as one of the musical guests on Rihanna's "Savage X Fenty" show. She posted a teaser containing a still from the music video as well as a line from the song on her social media that same day.

Composition
"Graveyard" is a pop and electropop song written by Halsey with Amy Allen, Jon Bellion, Jordan K. Johnson, Louis Bell, Mark Williams and Stefan Johnson. Its production was done by Bellion, Bell, Ojivolta and The Monsters and the Strangerz. According to Halsey, the song "is about being in love with someone who is in a bad place and loving them so much that you don't realize that you're going to that bad place with them". It also deals with the topic of caring for yourself instead of following others.

Critical reception
Althea Legaspi and Brittany Spanos of Rolling Stone wrote that the song's lyrical content "addresses following a relationship down a dark road despite warning signs" and noted the "contemplative guitar melody". Rania Aniftos at Billboard referred to the song as an "emotional tune". Writing for Idolator, Mike Nied complimented the song for being "self-aware, vulnerable and very relatable" and pointed out Jon Bellion's obvious presence on its production, calling it a "a lush pop production".

Music video
The song release was supported by a time-lapse visualizer of Halsey painting a self-portrait which also serves as the album cover for Manic. The official music video was released on October 8, 2019 and was directed by Anton Tammi. It features Halsey and a mysterious girl (Sydney Sweeney) magically from her notebook dancing alone in an amusement park. When the bridge starts, the mysterious girl disappears while Halsey enters an aquarium, which looks similar to the video for her song, "Clementine". Immediately, she wakes up into a white abandoned version of the park, later teleporting to her bedroom of the same color.

Live performances
Halsey performed "Graveyard" for the first time at the 2019 MTV Europe Music Awards on November 3, 2019; also during the 47th American Music Awards ceremony on November 24 and the Australian ARIA Music Awards of 2019 on November 27.

List of televised performances
 September 19, 2019 – Savage X Fenty Fashion Show
 September 30, 2019 – iHeartRadio Music Festival
 October 28, 2019 – The Ellen DeGeneres Show
 October 30, 2019 – Idol Sverige
 November 2, 2019 – MTV Europe Music Awards
 November 12, 2019 – Country Music Association Awards 
 November 15, 2019 – The Jonathan Ross Show
 November 24, 2019 – American Music Awards
 November 26, 2019 – Australian Recording Industry Association Music Awards
 December 9, 2019 – Pandora Live concert
 March 25, 2020 – CMT Crossroads

Other uses
The song appears on the US edition of Now That's What I Call Music! 73, marking the first appearance for Halsey in the US Now! series.

Credits and personnel
Credits adapted from Tidal and Spotify.

 Halsey – vocals, songwriting 
 Ojivolta – production
 Louis Bell – production, songwriting, record engineering, programming, keyboards
 Jon Bellion – production, songwriting, keyboards, programming
 Amy Allen – songwriting, background vocals, guitar
 Mark Williams – production, songwriting, guitar, keyboards, programming
 The Monsters and the Strangerz – production, songwriting, engineering, keyboards, programming
 Chris Gehringer – mastering engineering
 John Hanes – mixing engineering
 Serban Ghenea – mixing

Charts

Weekly charts

Year-end charts

Certifications

Release history

References

External links
 

2019 singles
2019 songs
Halsey (singer) songs
Songs written by Halsey (singer)
Songs written by Amy Allen (songwriter)
Songs written by Jon Bellion
Songs written by Louis Bell
Songs written by Stefan Johnson
Songs written by Jordan Johnson (songwriter)
Song recordings produced by the Monsters & Strangerz
Song recordings produced by Louis Bell
Song recordings produced by Jon Bellion